Boris Igorevich Khlebnikov (born August 28, 1972) is a Russian film director, screenwriter and producer.

Filmography

As director
 Roads to Koktebel (2003)
 Free Floating (2006)
 Help Gone Mad (2009)
 Crush (2009)
 Cherchill (2010)
 Bez svideteley (2012)
 Till Night Do Us Part (2012)
 A Long and Happy Life (2019)
 Hot and Bothered (2015) 
 Arrhythmia (2017)

As screenwriter
 Roads to Koktebel (2003)
 Free Floating (2006)
 Help Gone Mad (2009)
 Crush (2009)
 Till Night Do Us Part (2012)
 A Long and Happy Life (2019)
 Arrhythmia (2017)
 Heart of the World (2018)

References

External links

1972 births
Living people
Russian film directors